Royal Air Force Chedburgh or more simply RAF Chedburgh is a former Royal Air Force satellite station located near Bury St Edmunds, Suffolk, UK. The Bury Road Business Park is now located on the site, a principal enterprise being Yara UK Limited's liquid fertilizer production plant.

History

Murray Peden, a Royal Canadian Air Force pilot, recounts in his memoirs flying on his first attack on Germany, from RAF Chedburgh in September 1943. The target was Hanover. He was a new member of No. 214 Squadron RAF, which was equipped with four-engine Stirlings. He describes the long line of aircraft taxiing "ponderously" along a: "...perimeter track [which] ran within a hundred yards of Chedburgh's pub, before which the locals . . . had assembled for their nightly show."  In 2018, the pub building still stood, near the northwest corner of the old airfield.

The following units were here at some point:
 No. 23 Heavy Glider Maintenance Section of No. 2 Heavy Glider Maintenace Unit (? - March 1944)
 No. 214 Squadron RAF (1942-43)
 No. 218 Squadron RAF (1944-45)
 No. 301 Polish Bomber Squadron
 No. 304 Polish Bomber Squadron
 No. 620 Squadron RAF (1943)
 No. 1653 Heavy Conversion Unit RAF (November 1943 - November 1944)

References

Citations

Bibliography

Royal Air Force stations of World War II in the United Kingdom
Chedburgh